Budugen (died 233) was a Xianbei chieftain who lived during the late Eastern Han dynasty and Three Kingdoms period of China. He retained his independence by pledging allegiance to the state of Cao Wei during the Three Kingdoms period and sending tribute to Cao Pi, the first Wei emperor. During the reign of the second Wei emperor Cao Rui, Budugen attempted to form an alliance with another Xianbei chieftain, Kebineng, and start a rebellion against Wei rule. However, the rebellion was crushed and Budugen was killed by Kebineng.

See also
 Lists of people of the Three Kingdoms

References

 Chen, Shou (3rd century). Records of the Three Kingdoms (Sanguozhi).
 Pei, Songzhi (5th century). Annotations to Records of the Three Kingdoms (Sanguozhi zhu).

Year of birth unknown
233 deaths
People of Cao Wei